Anthony 'Monjaro' Akposheri is a Nigerian actor, model, and filmmaker. He played the role of the flight captain in the 2012 Nigerian thriller disaster film, Last Flight To Abuja. He is a native of Orogun town in Delta State, Nigeria.

Education
Anthony Monjaro holds a B.Sc. degree in multimedia & film production from the Thames Valley University, UK. He also has a diploma in performing art for screen from Goldsmith College, UK.

Career
Before moving to Nigeria, Anthony was a part-time actor working and living in the Uk. His first movie role in the Nigerian film industry was the role of the flight captain in the 2012 movie, Last Flight to Abuja. Following that, he played the character "OTTAH" in the daytime TV series, Tinsel.

Filmography
 Last Flight to Abuja (2012)
 Tinsel (TV series) 
 Quicksand
 After The Proposal
 Happy Ending
 +234
 Gidi Up (TV Series)
 4-1-Love
 The Duplex (2015)
 The First Lady (2015)
 Stalker (2016)
 Remember Me (2016)
 Lodgers (2016)
 The Women (2017)
The Women (2018)
 Wetin Women Want (2018)
 Wife Beater 
 One Room
 Crazy Lovely, Cool (2018)
 The Millions (2019)
 Obey (2019)
 For Old Times' Sake (2019)
 Ordinary Couple (2019)
 Heart and Soul (TV Series)(2019)
The Therapist (2021)
The Silent Baron

References

Living people
Year of birth missing (living people)
21st-century Nigerian male actors
Nigerian male television actors